"Runaway / My Girlfriend (Yuchun from 東方神起)" is Tohoshinki's 18th Japanese single, released on February 13, 2008. The single is the second installment of the song "Trick" in the album T.

Track listing

CD
 "Runaway"
 "My Girlfriend" (Yuchun from 東方神起)
 "Runaway" -Less Vocal‐
 "My Girlfriend" ‐Less Vocal‐ (Yuchun from 東方神起)

Release history

Charts

Oricon Sales Chart (Japan)

Korea Top 20 foreign albums & singles

References

External links
 https://web.archive.org/web/20050428085252/http://toho-jp.net/index.html

2008 singles
TVXQ songs
2008 songs
Avex Trax singles